Siril Helljesen (born 14 October 1978) is a Norwegian equestrian. She was born in Oslo. She finished 31st in the individual dressage at the 2012 Summer Olympics in London. She became the first Norwegian to compete in dressage event at the Olympics since 1952 Summer Olympics in Helsinki, Finland.

References

Norwegian female equestrians
Norwegian dressage riders
1978 births
Living people
Sportspeople from Oslo
Equestrians at the 2012 Summer Olympics
Olympic equestrians of Norway